Kam or Kaam (from Sanskrit: kama) means deep extensive desire, often sexual, and is counted among the cardinal sins in Sikhism.

Kam or KAM also refer to:

People and language
Kam (name), a list of people with either the given name, nickname or surname
Kam people, a Kadai people in China
Kam language, spoken in China
K. A. Manoharan (born 1951), nicknamed K.A.M., Indian Politician
Kam (rapper), born Craig A. Miller in 1970
Kam language (Nigeria) or Nyingwom, spoken in eastern Nigeria
Kams or the Kok people, a Nuristani tribe in Afghanistan and Pakistan

Businesses
Kam Air, an airline headquartered in Kabul, Afghanistan
KAM Manufacturing, a handbag manufacturer in Ohio, United States
Key account management, the idea of looking after large and important accounts that are critical to a business

Places
Kám, Hungary, a village
Kam, Mazandaran, Iran, a village
Kam, West Azerbaijan, Iran, a village
Kam Group, Northwest Territories, Canada, a volcanic group

Other uses of KAM
Kam River, a nickname for the Kaministiquia River in Ontario, Canada
Kentucky Active Militia, a state defense force active during World War II
The forerunner to KHAD, the secret police of the Democratic Republic of Afghanistan
Knowledge Assessment Methodology, an interactive benchmarking tool to help countries make the transition to a knowledge-based economy
Kolmogorov–Arnold–Moser theorem
Abbreviation for the phrase Kill all men

See also
Cam (disambiguation)

Language and nationality disambiguation pages